Duospina abolitor is a moth in the family Batrachedridae. It was described by Ronald W. Hodges in 1966. It is found in North America, where it has been recorded from Arizona.

References

Batrachedridae
Moths described in 1966